Brandon Moore may refer to:

 Brandon Moore (linebacker) (born 1979), American football linebacker
 Brandon Moore (guard) (born 1980), American football guard
 Brandon Moore (offensive tackle) (born 1970), American football offensive tackle
 Brandon Moore (rugby league) (born 1996), English rugby league player
 Brandon Moore (composer) (born 1976), American composer